Ashem Romi Devi (born 10 February 1989) is an Indian footballer who plays as a defender for Manipur Police Sports Club. She has been a member of the India women's national team.

Honours

India
 SAFF Women's Championship: 2010, 2012, 2014

Manipur
 Senior Women's National Football Championship: 2021–22

References

1989 births
Footballers from Manipur
Living people
India women's international footballers
Indian women's footballers
People from Imphal
Sportswomen from Manipur
Women's association football defenders
Footballers at the 2014 Asian Games
Asian Games competitors for India
Eastern Sporting Union players